Roihupelto (literal translation Blaze Field) is a neighborhood in eastern Helsinki, Finland. It was previously called Roihupellon teollisuusalue (Kasåkers industriområde, Roihupelto industrial area). It is a largely industrial area with few inhabitants. 

Vartiokylä